First Narayever Congregation is a traditional-egalitarian synagogue located at 187 Brunswick Avenue, in the Harbord Village neighbourhood of Toronto, Ontario, Canada. It is the largest Jewish congregation in downtown Toronto. It was founded by the Jewish immigrants from Narayiv, western Ukraine, hence the Yiddish name "Narayever".

Founded by 1914 as an Orthodox synagogue by Galician immigrants to Toronto, it was a landsmanshaft, an association whose members had immigrated from the same town, in this case the town of Naraiev. The congregation originally met in a rented building at the corner of Huron and Dundas. In 1943, the congregation acquired and moved to its current building on Brunswick which had previously been Bethel Church and originally a Foresters' Lodge.

In the decades following World War II, many of the congregants followed the rest of the Jewish community as it moved up Bathurst Street north of St. Clair Avenue, but some continued to travel downtown to attend the synagogue. Other Jews who had remained in the neighbourhood began attending after their own synagogues moved north. Younger professionals and more liberal members joined the congregation in the 1970s and 1980s and, after the older generation retired from the synagogue's board in 1983, an alternative egalitarian service was introduced downstairs while the Orthodox service continued in the main sanctuary. As attendance for the Orthodox service dwindled to the point that it was unable to attract a minyan, the egalitarian service moved upstairs and the synagogue began attracting more new members and went in a new direction, and is today unaffiliated with any larger Jewish religious movement.

Narayever today follows traditional halakha except in making no distinction on the basis of gender. The Lev Shalem siddur forms the basis of the liturgy. In 2009, the congregation voted to endorse the celebration of same-sex marriages.

Ed Elkin has been the congregation's rabbi since 2000.

References

External links 
First Narayever Congregation of Toronto
Detailed history and tour from the Ontario Jewish Archives

1914 establishments in Ontario
Ashkenazi Jewish culture in Toronto
Ashkenazi synagogues
Jewish Galician (Eastern Europe) history
Jewish organizations established in 1914
LGBT synagogues in Canada
Religious buildings and structures in Toronto
Synagogues completed in 1943
Synagogues in Toronto
Ukrainian-Canadian culture in Ontario
Ukrainian-Jewish diaspora
Unaffiliated synagogues
Yiddish culture in Canada
LGBT and Judaism
20th-century religious buildings and structures in Canada